Fredrik Forsberg (born 6 June 1996) is a Swedish professional ice hockey player. He is currently playing with Djurgårdens IF of the HockeyAllsvenskan (Allsv).

Playing career
Forsberg made his Swedish Hockey League debut playing with Djurgårdens IF against Skellefteå AIK on 19 September 2015. He scored the game-winning goal for Djurgården against Växjö Lakers in the round of 32 of the 2015–16 Champions Hockey League.

Forsberg played three seasons in the HockeyAllsvenskan with Almtuna IS, before making a return to the SHL for the 2019–20 season, signing a two-year contract with newly promoted Leksands IF on 17 April 2019.

References

External links

1996 births
Almtuna IS players
Djurgårdens IF Hockey players
Leksands IF players
Living people
Swedish ice hockey forwards